Vattiyoorkavu State assembly constituency is one of the 140 state legislative assembly constituencies in Kerala. It is also one of the 7 state legislative assembly constituencies included in the Thiruvananthapuram Lok Sabha constituency.
 As of the 2021 assembly elections, the current MLA is V. K. Prasanth of CPI(M).

Vattiyoorkavu constituency came into existence in 2011. Before it was known as Trivandrum North Constituency from 1977 to 2011, and Trivandrum-II constituency from 1957 to 1977.

Local self governed segments
Vattiyoorkavu Legislative Assembly Constituency is composed of the following local self governed segments:

Members of Legislative Assembly
The following list contains all members of Kerala legislative assembly who have represented Vattiyoorkavu Legislative Assembly Constituency during the period of various assemblies:

Key

    

As Trivandrum-II

As Trivandrum North

As Vattiyoorkavu

 * Byepoll

Election results

Niyamasabha election 2021

Percentage change (±%) denotes the change in the number of votes from the immediate previous election.

Partywise Results

Niyamasabha By-election 2019 
Due to the election of the sitting MLA K. Muraleedharan as the MP from Vatakara (Lok Sabha constituency), Vattiyoorkavu Constituency went to bypoll in 2019. There were 1,97,570 registered voters in Vattiyoorkavu Constituency for this election. V. K. Prashanth won by 14,465 votes in the subsequent election conducted in October 2019.

Niyamasabha Election 2016 
There were 1,95,239 registered voters in Vattiyoorkavu Constituency for the 2016 Kerala legislative assembly Election.

Niyamasabha Election 2011 
There were 1,75,398 registered voters in the constituency for the 2011 election.

See also 
 Vattiyoorkavu
 Thiruvananthapuram district
 List of constituencies of the Kerala Legislative Assembly
 2016 Kerala Legislative Assembly election
 2019 Kerala Legislative Assembly by-elections

References

Assembly constituencies of Kerala

State assembly constituencies in Thiruvananthapuram district